Hans Moser (19 January 1901 – 18 November 1974) was a Swiss equestrian and Olympic champion. He won an individual gold medal in dressage at the 1948 Summer Olympics in London.

References

External links

1901 births
1974 deaths
Swiss male equestrians
Swiss dressage riders
Olympic equestrians of Switzerland
Equestrians at the 1936 Summer Olympics
Equestrians at the 1948 Summer Olympics
Olympic gold medalists for Switzerland
Year of death unknown
Olympic medalists in equestrian
Medalists at the 1948 Summer Olympics
20th-century Swiss people